Edward 'Eddie' Frank Strong (born 1936), is a male former athlete who competed for England.

Athletics career
He represented England in the 3 miles race at the 1962 British Empire and Commonwealth Games in Perth, Western Australia.

He competed in the 1962 European Athletics Championships – Men's 5000 metres.

He was a member of the Bristol Club.

References

1936 births
English male long-distance runners
Athletes (track and field) at the 1962 British Empire and Commonwealth Games
Living people
Commonwealth Games competitors for England